The Sultan Qaboos Grand Mosque is the largest mosque in Oman, located in the capital city of Muscat.

Construction
In 1992, the then Sultan of Oman, Qaboos bin Said al Said, directed that his country should have a Grand Mosque. In 1993, a competition for the design of the proposed masque took place. The building contract was awarded to Carillion Alawi LLC. Construction commenced in December 1994, after a site was chosen at Bausher, and it took six years and seven months to build the mosque.

The mosque is made of stone, with doors, windows and embellishments made of wood and glass. Around 300,000 tons of Indian sandstone was imported for the building. Five minarets have been built around the premises of the mosque: the main minaret in height, and the four flanking minarets are the mosque’s chief visual features from the exterior. In the interior, the main musalla is the focus of both prayer and tourism. The dome is embellished spectacularly from the inside and it is a major tourist attraction in itself. The main musalla can hold over 6500 worshippers, while the women's musalla can accommodate 750 worshipers. The outer paved ground can hold 8000 worshipers and there is additional space available in the interior courtyard and the passageways, making a total capacity of up to 20,000 worshipers.

The newly built Grand Mosque was inaugurated by Sultan of Oman on May 4, 2001 to celebrate 30 years of his reign.

Interior
A major feature of the design of the interior is the prayer carpet which covers the floor of the prayer hall. It contains, 1,700,000,000 knots, weighs 21 tonnes and took four years to produce, and brings together the classical Persian Tabriz, Kashan and Isfahan design traditions. 28 colors in varying shades were used, the majority obtained from traditional vegetable dyes. It used to be the largest single-piece carpet in the world, but is now the second, after the Sheikh Zayed Mosque in Abu Dhabi, the UAE. This hand-woven carpet was produced by Iran Carpet Company (ICC) at the order of the Diwan of the Royal Court of Sultanate.

It weighs 8.5 tons, includes 600,000 crystals, 1,122 halogen bulbs complete with dimming system, and includes a staircase for maintenance within the chandelier. Thirty-four smaller chandeliers of the same design are hung in other parts of the building.

See also

 List of mosques in Oman
Sultan Qaboos Grand Mosque Sohar
Mohammed Al Ameen Mosque

References

External links

Official site from the Ministry of Tourism
Biggest Chandelier in the World
Official Panoramic virtual tour of the Grand Mosque by the Diwan of Royal Court

2001 establishments in Oman
Mosques completed in 2001
Mosques in Oman
Buildings and structures in Muscat, Oman
Mosque buildings with domes
Culture in Muscat, Oman
Tourist attractions in Muscat, Oman
Ibadi mosques
Grand mosques